Eucereon maia is a moth of the subfamily Arctiinae. It was described by Herbert Druce in 1884. It is found in Guatemala, Costa Rica, Trinidad and Ecuador.

References

 

maia
Moths described in 1884